Ralph 124C 41 +, by Hugo Gernsback, is an early science fiction novel, written as a twelve-part serial in Modern Electrics magazine, which Gernsback edited, beginning in April 1911. It was compiled into novel/book form in 1925. While it pioneered many ideas found in later science fiction, it has been critically panned for its "inept writing". The title contains a play on words, meaning "One to foresee for one another". In the introduction to the first volume of Science-Fiction Plus, dated March 1953, Gernsback called for patent reform to give science fiction authors the right to create patents for ideas without having patent models because many of their ideas predated the technical progress needed to develop specifications for their ideas. The introduction referenced the numerous prescient technologies described throughout Ralph 124C 41+.

Plot summary
The eponymous protagonist saves the life of the heroine by directing energy remotely at an approaching avalanche. As the novel goes on, he describes the technological wonders of the modern world, frequently using the phrase "As you know..." The hero finally rescues the heroine by traveling into space on his own "space flyer" to rescue her from the villain's clutches.

Accurate predictions
The novel includes microfilm, the vending machine, the jukebox, satellites, spaceflight, the tape recorder, artificial cloth, 
television (and channel surfing)  as well as remote-control power transmission, the videophone, transcontinental air service, solar energy in practical use, sound movies, synthetic milk and foods, and voiceprinting.

It also contains "...the first accurate description of radar, complete with diagram...", according to Arthur C. Clarke in his "non-genre" novel Glide Path (1963): "A pulsating polarized ether wave, if directed on a metal object can be reflected in the same manner as a light-ray is reflected from a bright surface or from a mirror..."

Specially named inventions and technological devices

Accelerated Plant Growing Farms Huge greenhouse farms that are used to feed the rapidly growing Earth population. They can grow five harvests per year as opposed to normal harvests of two in 1911.
Aeroflyer A small flying transport that can reach speeds of up to 600 mph.
Appetizer A large waiting room in more scientifically advanced restaurants. The room is flooded with gases that increase the appetite/hunger before eating.
Automatic-Electric Packing Machines'Bacillatorium A decontamination chamber for the home. It uses fictional Arcturium rays to kill bacteria, which can extend a person's total life expectancy to 120–140 years.
Electromobiles Basically an electric car that receives energy through a collector mast from city generators.
Gyroscope This is used to fly to other planets. Rocket propulsion is not mentioned at all. The rotation of a gyroscope can be used to counter vertical gravity.
Helio-Dynamophores Basically solar panels. To minimize atmospheric interference, Meteoro-Towers are used.
Hypnobioscope A sleep learning device. Information is recorded on black film as a white wavy line that is transmitted to the sleeper via wires into a headband with metal plates.
Luminor An automated lighting system that responds to voice commands to activate and change the intensity of illumination. This is an example of fluorescent lighting or cold light, but the term fluorescent lighting is not used in the story.
Menograph A device that can record a person's thoughts in writing using a type of mind-script.
Money The value of money is based on the faith and credit of the government. It can be dispensed like a roll tape. Denominations can be torn off the tape. No mention of electronic money is made.
Meteoro-Towers Weather control stations.
Newspaper A postage stamp-sized newspaper consisting of 8 pages. It can only be read by inserting it into a projector or portable viewer to see the very tiny print. Each page can be revealed by exposing it to a different color of light, which will also hide the other 7 pages from sight. It is updated every 30 minutes. No mention of electronic news or an internet is made.
Packet-Post Conveyor Underground postal delivery system using conveyor belts.
Permagatol A green gas that preserves organic matter indefinitely without any deterioration whatsoever.
Phonolphabet Machine A voice recorder that records speech graphically using a phonolphabet language. One can either read the recording or play it back as an audio recording.
Platinum-Barium-Arturium Eyeglasses Basically X-ray specs that really work, except they can only detect radium-infused elements through solid matter.
Pulsating Polarized Ether Wave Basically a type of radar device before the word "radar" was coined.
Radioperforer A handheld weapon that shoots Radium beams that can stun or kill.
Signalizers A searchlight guidance system for flying machines consisting of multiple colors and blinking patterns
Space Flyer An interplanetary flying machine using gyroscopes.
Subatlantic Tube An underground train that uses magnetism to move 300 mph. The path of the tube is through the Earth to make a direct path from Europe to North America.
Basically a fax machine, except handwriting transfers as the person writes.
Tele-Motor Coasters
Telephot This is basically a picture phone. It also includes a universal translator, where language translation can be opted using a dial control.
Teleradiograph
Tele-Theater This is like a television, but with differences. It is really a series of  that almost seamlessly combine to make up one large picture. Live events like an opera or a play can be seen from one's home with this device. Communications can be made in both directions while the device is broadcasting. It is not mentioned if it can be used to show previously recorded entertainment.
Vacation City A domed city suspended 20,000 feet in the air using a device that nullifies gravity. No mechanical devices are permitted in such cities because they are strictly used as an escape from a mechanized world.

 Influence and critical reception 
Even though Ralph 124C 41+ has been described as pioneering many of the tropes and ideas found in later science fiction works, it has largely been neglected due to what critics often describe as poor artistic quality. Brian Aldiss has called the story a "tawdry illiterate tale" and a "sorry concoction", while Lester del Rey called it "simply dreadful". Martin Gardner referred to the book as "surely the worst SF novel ever written". Groff Conklin more generously described it as "thoroughly delightful ... [with] the genuine charm of a sound, workmanlike antique."

Reviewing the 1950 Frederick Fell edition in The New York Times, Rex Lardner wrote that while the "fine" novel "contain[ed] a good deal of sound prophecy, ... it has a narrative style as quaint as the retarder on a Hupmobile." Everett F. Bleiler similarly noted that "The literary treatment is on a very low level, but Ralph 124C41+ is renowned for its many highly imaginative technical projections."

While most critics have little positive to say about the story's writing, Gary Westfahl, one of the book's few public defenders, considered it "essential text for all studies of science fiction", and The Economist called it "arguably the first major work of American science fiction". According to Westfahl, "the novel merits attention because of the ways Gernsback uneasily blended several generic models – melodrama, the travel tale, Utopia, even touches of Gothic and Satire – in an effort to achieve a workable vehicle for a story emphasizing scientific facts and predictions. In this way, the novel foreshadows and makes explicit many of the generic tensions that permeate later sf."

Popular references
In the anime Ergo Proxy, the main character, Re-l Mayer, has the ID number 124C41+.

The first issue of the comics series Crossed: +100 by Alan Moore and Gabriel Andrade is titled 124C41+. In the year 2108, the main character, archivist Future Taylor discovers in a preserved public library an Encyclopedia of Science Fiction and learns about the original novel.

In the DC comic Captain Carrot and His Amazing Zoo Crew!, the Crew battle an alien named Ralf-124C4U.

In the Netflix series Disenchantment'' season 3 episode "Steamland Confidential", Princess Tiabeanie goes undercover at a Steamland factory.  At the 1611 mark in the episode, she is called by her worker number, 124C41.

See also 
 1911 in science fiction

References

External links 
  
 

Hugo Gernsback
1911 American novels
1911 science fiction novels
American science fiction novels
Novels first published in serial form
Works originally published in American magazines
Works originally published in science and technology magazines